Wild Abandon is a 2022 Turkish streaming television series starring Öner Erkan, Haluk Bilginer and Songül Öden. The show was released on Netflix on 30 March 2022.

Cast 
 Öner Erkan as Oktay Uysal
 Haluk Bilginer as Berhudar
 Songül Öden as Nil Uysal
 Uğur Yücel as Olcay Uysal
 İbrahim Selim as Mert
 Nezaket Erden as Yağmur
 Serkan Altunorak as Suat Uysal
 Umut Yeşildağ	as Ege Uysal
 Biljana Jovanovska as Sofia
 Nilay Yeral as Ece Uysal
 Durukan Ordu  as Moloz

References

External links
 
 

2022 Turkish television series debuts
2022 Turkish television series endings
2020s Turkish television series
Turkish drama television series
Turkish-language Netflix original programming
Television shows set in Istanbul
Works about artists